The Type DT5 is an electric multiple unit (EMU) train type operated by the Hamburger Hochbahn AG on the Hamburg U-Bahn system. It is the first type of rolling stock on the Hamburg U-Bahn that has air conditioning and gangways between the individual cars.

Formation
Every DT5 train consists of three permanently-coupled cars. The cars are connected with gangways, allowing passengers to walk into the adjacent cars. Up to three units can be coupled together.

Interior
The interior consists of red upholstered seating, and spaces for wheelchairs and prams. The trains have displays which show the names of the next four stations, and CCTV cameras. The interior is air conditioned.

Technical specifications
The train is built to an articulated design, with the two end cars only having one bogie, while the center car has two bogies. The car bodies are made out of stainless steel, and the trains are powered by three-phase motors. In order to save weight, the DT5 trains use aluminium brake discs, which make a loud squealing sound while braking.

History
A European-Union–wide tender for the construction of the DT5 trains began in 2005. Siemens, Stadler, Rotem and a consortium of Alstom and Bombardier bid for the contract. The trains were ordered in December 2006 from the consortium of Alstom and Bombardier at a cost of 240 million Euros. The first unit was delivered to the Barmbek depot on December 1, 2011. Further DT5 trains were ordered in 2016, 2018 and 2019 bringing the total number of ordered trains to 163, of which 163 have already been delivered.

References

External links

 Hochbahn fleet information 

Hamburg U-Bahn
Electric multiple units of Germany
750 V DC multiple units
Alstom multiple units
Bombardier Transportation multiple units